Sangolda is a village in Bardez sub-district, North Goa, India.

Location
Nearest airport is Dabolim Airport and railway station is at Tivim.

Religion and culture

Photograph of Mae de Deus chapel before 2010

References

External links
 About Sangolda

Villages in North Goa district